Nicolas Joseph Bechtel (born February 15, 2005) is an American actor. He is best known for his portrayal of Spencer Cassadine (2013–2020) on ABC's General Hospital and the Disney Channel sitcom Stuck in the Middle.

Early life
Bechtel is the son of Nick and Julie Bechtel. He was born on February 15, 2005, in Fontana, California. He has an older sister, Nicole. His middle name is Joseph, after his maternal grandfather, with whom Bechtel is very close.

Career
Bechtel made his television debut in a 2012 episode of the NBC soap opera, Days of Our Lives in the role of Josh. In May 2013, Bechtel made his debut in the role of Spencer on General Hospital. In 2014, Bechtel announced that he was cast in Fox's Steven Spielberg produced comedic drama, Red Band Society. He would play a younger version of Nolan Sotillo's Jordi. Bechtel appeared in three episodes. In 2015, Bechtel was cast in the Disney pilot for Stuck in the Middle lead by Jenna Ortega. The series premiered in March 2016. In 2016, Bechtel appeared as Rob Kardashian in FX's anthology series, The People v. O. J. Simpson: American Crime Story. Stuck in the Middle was cancelled after three seasons in 2018. In 2019, Bechtel was cast opposite fellow General Hospital alumni, Nathan Parsons in the Jeremy Camp biopic, I Still Believe which hit theaters in March 2020. Bechtel reprised the role of Spencer for one episode on January 20, 2020. It would turn out to be Bechtel's last appearance in the role as the character was recast in 2021.

Filmography

Awards and nominations

References

External links
 

American male soap opera actors
People from Fontana, California
2005 births
Living people